Tolna limula is a species of moth of the family Noctuidae first described by Heinrich Benno Möschler in 1883. It is found in Africa, including South Africa.

References

Endemic moths of South Africa
Catocalinae